Salesi Sika (born 7 July 1980 in Haveluloto, Tonga) is a former Tongan-born American rugby union player and played as a wing or centre.

Sika played professional rugby in the French league for Castres Olympique and AS Béziers. He was a member of the United States national rugby union team from 2003–2009 and participated with the squad at the 2003 Rugby World Cup and the  2007 Rugby World Cup.

Sika also played rugby for Brigham Young University in Utah where he was four time collegiate All-American, and played in the championship game in his senior year.

See also
 United States national rugby union team

References

1980 births
Living people
American rugby union players
United States international rugby union players
Tongan rugby union players
Tongan Latter Day Saints
American Latter Day Saints
Tongan emigrants to the United States
People from Tongatapu
Rugby union centres
Rugby union wings